Mount Superior (also known as Superior Peak) is an  mountain peak in the Uinta-Wasatch-Cache National Forest in Salt Lake County, Utah, United States.

With prominent visibility from Utah State Route 210 in Little Cottonwood Canyon, and being only 35 minutes from downtown Salt Lake City, it is a popular hiking, climbing, and skiing destination.

Routes
There are many ways to access the summit of Mount Superior, with the two most popular options being via the Cardiff Pass and South Ridge trails.

Cardiff Pass 

This trail follows a well-maintained route starting in the town of Alta until it reaches Cardiff Pass. Once the pass has been reached, a hike and scramble along the ridgeline is followed until you reach the summit.

South Ridge
Another popular option to reach the summit is via the South Ridge, considered a 5th class scramble or rock climb. Depending on ones climbing experience and conditions you may choose to free solo or bring ropes and other rock climbing equipment.

Skiing and Snowboarding
There are various skiing and snowboarding lines that descend Mount Superior on all aspects.

South Face
This descent is included in Fifty Classic Ski Descents of North America and is rated S4 with slopes 35–45° with dangerous fall potential and a few terrain obstacles. It is also a part of The Chuting Gallery: A Guide to Steep Skiing in the Wasatch Mountains, a skiing guidebook for various Wasatch Range chutes.

Suicide Chute or Shane's Chute
An obvious and prominent east-facing chute seen from Little Cottonwood Canyon, this line has been known by a few names, but is most commonly referenced as Suicide Chute. This descent has slopes upwards of 40° and is rated S4.

References

External links

Mountains of Utah
Mountains of Salt Lake County, Utah
Wasatch Range